Park Byung-Geon (born May 19, 1982; Hanja:朴炳建) is a South Korean football player who played as forward for Changwon City FC at National League in South Korea.

References
 N-League player search: 박병건 

1982 births
Living people
Association football forwards
South Korean footballers
Footballers from Seoul